The Georgetown University Police Department (GUPD) is a campus police department responsible for providing security and law enforcement for Georgetown University's main campus and Medical Center in Washington, D.C., as well as properties owned by the university.

Overview 

Upon application of the university, the members of the department are commissioned as special police officers by the Mayor of the District of Columbia, whose authority to commission officers derives from § 5–129.02 of the Code of the District of Columbia and which is in turn delegated to the Chief of Police of the Metropolitan Police Department. For this reason, Georgetown police officers have full powers of arrest on campus property.

In addition to law enforcement and patrolling the campus by foot, vehicle, and bicycle, the department provides self-defense training to members of the university, security for campus residences and high-profile events, and safety escorts throughout the Georgetown, Burleith, and Foxhall neighborhoods. Until 2013, the Georgetown University Police Department was named the Georgetown University Department of Public Safety (DPS).

 Chief of Police is Jay Gruber, who assumed the position on July 30, 2012.

See also 
 List of law enforcement agencies in the District of Columbia

References

External links 

 Georgetown University Police Department

Georgetown University
University and college police forces of the United States
Law enforcement agencies of the District of Columbia